Don Vaughan is a Canadian ice hockey coach and former player. Vaughan has been the head coach at Colgate since 1992–93 and is the programs leader in both wins and tenure.

Career
Vaughan began his college career at Canton College, playing for the hockey team for one season before transferring to the cross-town St. Lawrence University, a private university. More importantly Vaughan was now playing for a Division I program. Under Mike McShane Vaughan put up respectable numbers in his three seasons as the Saints posted winning records each year and made the 1983 NCAA Tournament, falling to eventual champion Wisconsin in the quarterfinals.

After graduating with a degree in economics Vaughan headed to Europe to serve as the player-coach for the Enschede Lions, an ice hockey club in the Netherlands.

In 1991 long-time Colgate coach Terry Slater died suddenly and, after the season was finished under Brian Durocher, Vaughan was picked to replace him. The initial seasons were a bit lacking but Vaughan built the program back to its winning ways soon enough, giving the Colgate faithful a 20-win season in 1994–95 which started them on to six consecutive winning seasons culminating with their first NCAA tournament berth in a decade. The season finished with Vaughan being awarded the 2000 ECAC Hockey Coach of the Year Award.

In 2003 Vaughan agreed to serve out the season as Colgate's interim athletic director, allowing long-time assistant Stan Moore to assume control of the team for the year. The Raiders performed exceptionally in his absence, winning a regular season title and earning Moore his own Coach of the Year Award. Not to be outdone, when Vaughen returned the following season he pushed Colgate to a 25-win season (the second-highest total in school history), earning him a second tournament berth which he followed up by winning his first regular season title.

After that the team began to flounder, failing to produce a winning season until 2011–12, but it wasn't all bad news for Vaughan as Colgate established an endowed hockey chair named in his honor.

Career statistics

Head coaching record

See also
 List of college men's ice hockey coaches with 400 wins

References

External links
 

Canadian ice hockey coaches
Colgate Raiders men's ice hockey coaches
ice hockey people from Ontario
living people
people from Almonte, Ontario
St. Lawrence Saints men's ice hockey players
year of birth missing (living people)